Dmitriyevka is a rural locality (a selo) in Pokrovsky Selsoviet of Akhtubinsky District, Astrakhan Oblast, Russia. The population was 19 as of 2010. There is 1 street.

Geography 
Dmitriyevka is located 18 km northwest of Akhtubinsk (the district's administrative centre) by road. Pokrovka is the nearest rural locality.

References 

Rural localities in Akhtubinsky District